Banda Qazi is one of the 51 union councils of Abbottabad District in Khyber-Pakhtunkhwa province of Pakistan. According to the 2017 Census of Pakistan, the population is 30,604.

Subdivisions
 Banda Amlok
 Banda Kher Ali Khan
 Banda Laman
 Banda Noor Ahmed
 Banda Phagwarian
 Banda Qazi
 Banda Sher Khan
 Dehri
 Dobathar

References

Union councils of Abbottabad District